Law #1 of August 4, 1952 of the Commonwealth of Puerto Rico established a full state holiday on July 25 of every year, to be known as Puerto Rico Constitution Day.  The holiday commemorates the day the Constitution of Puerto Rico, approved on July 3, 1952, was signed into law by Governor Luis Muñoz Marín the same year.

Up to then, July 25 had been a holiday in Puerto Rico, known as "Occupation Day", to commemorate the arrival of United States military forces on July 25, 1898 in an area of the municipality of Yauco that in the early 20th century would become the separate municipality of Guánica.

The government of Puerto Rico holds a commemorative ceremony every year, the most recent of which was held at the Puerto Rico Department of State headquarters building, the "Edificio de la Real Intendencia", in Old San Juan with the mayor of Yauco, Abel Nazario, as the keynote speaker and Supreme Court Associate Justice Edgardo Rivera Garcia in charge of the reading of the Constitution's Preamble.

References

Public holidays in Puerto Rico
Constitution days
July observances